The fauna of South America consists of a huge variety of unique animals some of which evolved in relative isolation. The isolation of South America had an abrupt end some few million years ago when the Isthmus of Panama was formed, allowing small scale migration of animals that would result in the Great American Interchange which caused many marsupials such as Thylacosmilus to go extinct.  America is the continent with the largest number of recorded bird species.

Images 
Four examples of animals in South America appear below:

Sources

References

See also